The 2018 Cary Challenger was a professional tennis tournament played on hard courts. It was the 4th edition of the tournament which was part of the 2018 ATP Challenger Tour. It took place in Cary, North Carolina, United States between 10 and 16 September 2018.

Singles main-draw entrants

Seeds

 1 Rankings are as of August 27, 2018.

Other entrants
The following players received wildcards into the singles main draw:
  William Blumberg
  Alexis Galarneau
  Sebastian Korda
  Nick Stachowiak

The following players received entry from the qualifying draw:
  Joris De Loore
  James Duckworth
  Evan Song
  J. J. Wolf

Champions

Singles

 James Duckworth def.  Reilly Opelka 7–6(7–4), 6–3.

Doubles

 Evan King /  Hunter Reese def.  Fabrice Martin /  Hugo Nys 6–4, 7–6(8–6).

References

2018 ATP Challenger Tour
2018